Marry Me a Little is a musical with lyrics and music by Stephen Sondheim, conceived by Craig Lucas and Norman René. The revue sets songs cut from Sondheim's better-known musicals, as well as songs from his then-unproduced musical Saturday Night  to a dialogue-free plot about the relationship between two lonely New York single people, who are in emotional conflict during an evening in their separate one-room apartments. Despite knowing of the other's existence, they never get up the courage to talk to each other, though they imagine what such an encounter might be like.

History
The musical originally was staged by the off-off-Broadway Production Company. It opened on October 29, 1980 and closed December 28, 1980. It re-opened March 12, 1981 at the off-Broadway Actor's Playhouse, where it ran for 96 performances. Directed by Rene and choreographed by Don Johanson, it starred Craig Lucas and Suzanne Henry. On June 7, 1982  the musical opened at the King's Head Theatre, London, directed by Robert Cushman and choreographed by Dennis Grimaldi. The revue has been performed in US regional theaters such as GroundWorks Theatre, Nashville, Tennessee in March 2009  and the Cincinnati Playhouse in the Park, Cincinnati, Ohio, in May 2009.

In late 1998 actor Steve Gideon proposed a revival of the work with the casting of a male same-sex couple to play the leads. He approached Stephen Sondheim with the idea and was given permission. The new version of the work debuted at the Celebration Theatre in Hollywood, CA in 1999.

In 2008, Marry Me a Little was performed in South Africa in a production starring David Fick opposite Talia Egelhof and then Nathan Fredericks in two successive runs of the show at the Intimate Theatre in Cape Town from 28 June - 5 July. The production was directed by Jacqui Kowen, with musical direction by Victor Tichart.

In 2012, the Off-Broadway Keen Company presented a new version of Marry Me a Little starring Jason Tam and Lauren Molina. This production included several new songs and a new concept.  The production was directed by Jonathan Silverstein and started previews September 11, 2012, opening October 2, 2012 at the Clurman Theatre at Theatre Row.  Both Stephen Sondheim and Craig Lucas were involved in the project.

In January, 2013, The New Repertory Theatre in Watertown, Massachusetts, under the direction of Ilyse Robbins, received permission to do a gender-neutral staging of Marry Me a Little, using four actors—two women and two men—and two pianists.  The action here takes place in four apartments in Manhattan, with varying pairing up on songs as man and woman, woman and woman, and man and man (this latter pairing effectively used especially in the lyrics of "So Many People" from Saturday Night).  At the end of the performance the four actors do meet for a closing finale.

In March, 2014, a Canadian production of Marry Me a Little opened at the Tarragon Theatre in Toronto, directed by Adam Brazier and starring Elodie Gillett and Adrian Marchuk. The production showed the two characters living together in a relationship that eventually comes to an end.

From June 29 to August 10, 2014, a British production opened at the St James Theatre in London, directed by Hannah Chissick, under the musical direction of David Randall, and starring Simon Bailey and Laura Pitt-Pulford. The critically acclaimed, sell-out production went on to get another week at the St James Theatre's Studio from October 6 to October 11, 2014.

From January 28 to February 13, 2017, the show was presented at The Gallery Players directed by Barrie Gelles and starring Jesse Manocherian, Alyson Leigh Rosenfeld, Adrian Rifat, Paul Williams, Cassandra Dupler and Laura Cetti. A first for this show, there were three rotating casts performing each weekend: one duo was male and female, one was an all-male duo, and one was an all-female duo.

In Autumn 2020, the production had a socially distanced run at the Barn Theatre in Cirencester, starring Rob Houchen, Celinde Schoenmaker and Waylon Jacobs. It was the first show of International City Theatre's 2022 season in Long Beach, California.

A production of the show will be presented February 16-18, 2023, at the Yale Cabaret of the David Geffen Yale School of Drama, New Haven, Connecticut.

Song list
"Saturday Night" (from Saturday Night) - Woman, Man
"Two Fairy Tales" (cut from A Little Night Music) - Woman, Man
"Can That Boy Foxtrot!" (cut from Follies) - Woman, Man
"All Things Bright and Beautiful" (cut from Follies) - Woman, Man
"Bang!" (cut from A Little Night Music) - Woman, Man
"All Things Bright and Beautiful (Part 2)" (cut from Follies) - Woman, Man
"The Girls of Summer" (from The Girls of Summer) - Woman, Man
"Uptown, Downtown" (cut from Follies) - Man
"So Many People" (from Saturday Night) - Woman, Man 
"Your Eyes Are Blue" (cut from A Funny Thing Happened on the Way to the Forum) - Woman, Man 
"A Moment With You" (from Saturday Night) - Woman, Man
"Marry Me a Little" (from Company) - Woman
"Happily Ever After" (cut from Company) - Man
"Pour Le Sport" (from The Last Resorts, unproduced) - Woman, Man
"Silly People" (cut from A Little Night Music) - Man
"There Won't Be Trumpets" (cut from Anyone Can Whistle) - Woman, Man
"It Wasn't Meant to Happen" (cut from Follies) - Man, Woman
"Who Could Be Blue?" (cut from Follies) - Man, Woman
"Little White House" (cut from Follies) - Man, Woman

Notes

References
Stanley Green, Richard Walters, Robert Viagas. The Singer's Musical Theatre Anthology: Soprano Vol. 3
Craig Zadan. Sondheim & Co., Second Edition 1986, pp343–344, 381.
New York Times, John S. Wilson, "Theater: 'Marry Me,' With Sondheim Songs", November 2, 1980
 http://www.sondheimguide.com/marry.html

External links
Marry Me a Little on The Stephen Sondheim Reference Guide
Internet Off-Broadway database listing
Plot and production information at guidetomusicaltheatre.com
Marry Me a Little at the Music Theatre
 St James Theatre, London. 
 St James Studio, London. 
International website
Steve Gideon proposes new "Marry Me a Little"

1980 musicals
Off-Broadway musicals
One-act musicals
Musicals by Stephen Sondheim
Revues
Sung-through musicals